The Megamerinidae are a family of flies (Diptera) with about 11 species in three genera. They are small and are marked by an elongated, basally constricted abdomen. The family has been variously placed in the past within the superfamilies Diopsoidea, Nerioidea and more recently in Opomyzoidea but the evolutionary relationships remain unclear.

Description
For terms see Morphology of DipteraThese are slender, medium-sized flies, with long abdomens. The hind femora are  thickened, and bear two rows of spinules on the lower side. The costa is entire and the anal cell is elongated. They have no ocelli.

Biology
The  biology of immature Megamerinidae is poorly known, but larvae have been recorded as predators living under bark or decaying vegetation.

References
Citations

Sources
Family description
Hennig. 1941. Megamerinidae. In: Lindner, E. (Ed.). Die Fliegen der Paläarktischen Region  5,39,1-4. Keys to Palaearctic species but now needs revision (in German).

Schizophora
Opomyzoidea